The Dawn of Grace is a Christmas album by the alternative rock and indie pop band Sixpence None the Richer. The record was released on October 14, 2008.

Background
The Dawn of Grace was produced by Steve Hindalong and consists of eight traditional Christmas songs, including "Angels We Have Heard on High" and "Silent Night", featuring guest vocalist Dan Haseltine of Jars of Clay, and two original Sixpence Christmas tunes called "The Last Christmas" and "Christmas for Two". The subtitle on the cover reads: A Collection of Original and Traditional Christmas Songs. Although no singles were released from the album, two animated music videos were released for "Angels We Have Heard on High" and "Silent Night". The album reached No. 47 on the U.S. Christian Album Chart. After spending four years apart, the band reunited for this album.

Track listing
 "Angels We Have Heard on High" — 4:15
 "The Last Christmas" (Matt Slocum, Steve Hindalong) — 3:12
 "O Come, O Come, Emmanuel" — 3:06
 "Silent Night" (featuring Dan Haseltine of Jars of Clay) — 4:28
 "Riu Riu Chiu" — 3:06
 "Carol of the Bells" — 2:24
 "Christmas Island" (Lyle Moraine) — 2:33
 "River" (Joni Mitchell) — 3:57
 "Christmas for Two" (Leigh Nash, Kate York) — 3:09
 "Some Children See Him" (Alfred Burt) — 4:14

Credits

 Derri Daughterty – co-producer, engineer
 Jason Lehning – mixing
 Steve Hindalong – producer
 Leigh Nash – vocals

References

Sixpence None the Richer albums
2008 albums
2008 Christmas albums
Christmas albums by American artists
Nettwerk Records albums
Alternative rock Christmas albums